Willie Smith (8 October 1876  – 26 December 1916) was a Scottish golfer. He won the 1899 U.S. Open.

Early life
Willie Smith was born in Dundee, Scotland on 8 October 1876. He learned to play golf in Carnoustie. His brothers Alex and Macdonald were also expert golfers.

Golf career

1899 U.S. Open
Smith worked as a club professional at Midlothian Country Club, near Chicago, in his early adulthood. During this time he won the 1899 U.S. Open, played at Baltimore Country Club's Roland Park Course. He won by a margin of eleven shots. This record wasn't broken during the entire 20th century and wasn't surpassed until Tiger Woods won the 2000 championship by fifteen shots. Smith's prize was $150. He played in nine U.S. Opens in total, and made the top-10 in eight of them, but he did not win again.

Western Open and California State Open
In 1899, Smith won the first Western Open in a playoff against Laurie Auchterlonie. He also won the 1900 California State Open.

Later life
In 1904, Smith moved to Mexico City to become the golf pro at the Mexico City Country Club.  He was injured during the Mexican Revolution. He had refused to leave his post at the country club and was found trapped under a fallen beam after Emiliano Zapata's troops ransacked the club which they saw as a symbol of the corrupt ruling class. He was tasked with designing a new course, the Club de Golf Chapultepec, however due to his death it was completed by his brother Alex Smith. It has hosted the Mexican Open multiple times, and the WGC-Mexico Championship since 2017.

Death
He died of pneumonia on 26 December 1916. His body was returned to Scotland for burial in the family plot.

Major championships

Wins (1)

Results timeline
Smith played in only the U.S. Open and The Open Championship.

DNP = Did not play
WD = withdrew
"T" indicates a tie for a place
Green background for wins. Yellow background for top-10

References

External links
Article on early Scottish golfers in the U.S. (including the Smith brothers)

Scottish male golfers
Winners of men's major golf championships
Golf course architects
Sportspeople from Dundee
Golfers from Carnoustie
Sportspeople from Angus, Scotland
Scottish emigrants to the United States
Scottish emigrants to Mexico
Deaths from pneumonia in Mexico
1876 births
1916 deaths